Kalimantan Institute of Technology (abbreviated as ITK) is a technological-focused public university based in Balikpapan, East Kalimantan, Indonesian.

History 
ITK was created in 2012 as part of the implementation of the Master Plan for Acceleration and Expansion on Indonesia's Economic Development (Indonesian: Masterplan Percepatan dan Perluasan Pembangunan Ekonomi Indonesia) or MP3EI. At the time, East Kalimantan had one university, Mulawarman University. ITK started collaborating with Sepuluh Nopember Institute of Technology with the latter also providing ITK’s first campuses until 2015. Despite that, ITK had already started accepting students in 2012, with 100 students from East Kalimantan exclusively as its first-year batch. Originally, only five majors were available to the students: Electrical Engineering, Machine Engineering, Naval Engineering, Chemical Engineering, and Civil Engineering. By 2013, the number of majors available increased, and ITK started accepting students from outside East Kalimantan. In 2014, ITK officially became a public university (Indonesian: Perguruan Tinggi Negeri), and by 2015, ITK started operating from its Balikpapan campus.

Logo and philosophy 
The logo of the university consists of two aspects, each with their own meaning:

 Two hornbills, referring to balance and consistency in creating a generation of achieving students that can contribute to society.
 Two hands holding an opened book, referring to the importance of scientific knowledge.

Academics

Faculties 
ITK has a total of 21 programs across five faculties and all of them at the undergraduate level:

Faculty of Mathematics and Information Technology 

 Mathematics
 Informatics
 Information Systems
 Actuarial Science
 Statistics

Faculty of Science, Food, and Maritime Technology 

 Physics
 Ocean Engineering
 Naval Engineering
 Food Technology

Faculty of Industrial Technology and Processes 

 Machine Engineering
 Electrical Engineering
 Chemical Engineering
 Industrial Engineering

Faculty of Civil Engineering and Planning 

 Civil Engineering
 Urban Planning
 Architecture

Faculty of Earth Science and Environment 

 Environmental Engineering
 Material and Metallurgy Engineering

Ranking 
According to Webometrics’ 2021 report, ITK is ranked at 292 amongst all university in Indonesia.

References 

Universities in Indonesia